Juan Salvador Rizzo (born July 6, 1906 in Buenos Aires; date of death unknown) was an Argentine professional football player. He also held Uruguayan citizenship.

1906 births
Year of death missing
Argentine footballers
Racing Club de Montevideo players
Argentine expatriate footballers
Expatriate footballers in Italy
Argentine expatriate sportspeople in Italy
Expatriate footballers in Uruguay
Serie A players
Serie B players
Inter Milan players
Pisa S.C. players
Catania S.S.D. players
Expatriate footballers in Switzerland
FC Lugano players
Association football midfielders
Footballers from Buenos Aires